LY-393558 is a potent serotonin reuptake inhibitor and antagonist of the 5-HT1B, 5-HT1D, and 5-HT2A receptors. LY-393558 was also found to reduce serotonin-induced vasoconstriction, indicating that it may have therapeutic potential for the treatment of pulmonary hypertension.

References

5-HT1 antagonists
5-HT2 antagonists
Benzothiadiazines
Fluoroarenes
Indoles
Tetrahydropyridines
Sulfones